Dimetridazole is a drug that combats protozoan infections. It is a nitroimidazole class drug.  It used to be commonly added to poultry feed. This led to it being found in eggs. Because of suspicions of it being carcinogenic its use has been legally limited but it is still found in the eggs.  It is now banned as a livestock feed additive in many jurisdictions, for example in the European Union, Canada. and the United States. In the US, the Food and Drug Administration bans it for extralabel use

See also
 Metronidazole
 Nimorazole

References

Antiparasitic agents
Nitroimidazole antibiotics